World Trade Centre is a rapid transit station on the Red Line of the Dubai Metro in Dubai, UAE, serving the area around the Dubai World Trade Centre (DWTC) building. The station is named after the World Trade Centre.

The station opened as part of the Red Line on 15 May 2010. It is close to the World Trade Centre and the API World Tower (aka Al Ali Tower). The station is also close to a number of bus routes.

See also
 Dubai World Trade Centre building

References

Railway stations in the United Arab Emirates opened in 2010
Dubai Metro stations